Pleuropasta is a genus of blister beetles in the family Meloidae. There are at least two described species in Pleuropasta.

Species
These two species belong to the genus Pleuropasta:
 Pleuropasta mirabilis (Horn, 1870)
 Pleuropasta reticulata Van Dyke, 1947

References

Further reading

 
 

Meloidae
Articles created by Qbugbot